The 1966 United States Senate election in Colorado took place on November 8, 1966. Incumbent Republican Senator Gordon Allott was re-elected to a third term in office, defeating Democratic State Senator Roy Romer.

Romer would later be elected three terms as Treasurer of Colorado and another three terms as governor.

General election

Results

See also 
 1966 United States Senate elections

References 

1966
Colorado
United States Senate